The First Troop Philadelphia City Cavalry, also known as the First City Troop, is a unit of the Pennsylvania Army National Guard. It is one of the oldest military units in the United States still in active service and is among the most decorated units in the U.S. Army. Accordingly, the Troop operates under a number of principles of self-governance unique in the U.S. military, including the election of unit members and officers, voluntarily forgoing pay for military service to the country, continuing to practice horse cavalry skills and tactics, and recruiting a high percentage of its members from veterans of prior active duty service across all branches (many of whom resign past officer commissions to join), as well as older civilian mid-career professionals.

It is the only U.S. military unit that owns its own armory building, built with private funds in Philadelphia's Rittenhouse Square neighborhood.

As of November 2017, the troop had 46 active members (33 drilling with the A-1/104th CAV), up from 35 in 2014.

History
The First Troop Philadelphia City Cavalry, or "First City Troop", was organized in 1774 as the Light Horse of the City of Philadelphia, often referred to as the Philadelphia Light Horse, one of the first patriotic military organizations established in the American Revolution.

Abraham Markoe was the founder and the first Captain of the Philadelphia Light Horse, known today as the First Troop Philadelphia City Cavalry.

Early members came from a number of local social organizations, including the Schuylkill Fishing Company, the Schuylkill Company of Fort St. Davids, the St. Andrew's Society of Philadelphia, the Society of the Friendly Sons of St. Patrick, the Society of the Sons of St. George, and especially the Gloucester Fox Hunting Club. Captain Samuel Morris was Gloucester's first president and Captain Robert Wharton its last.

During the Revolution, the troop fought in the battles of Trenton, Princeton, Brandywine, and Germantown. It often served as George Washington's personal bodyguard. The unit also saved James Wilson at the "Battle of Fort Wilson" riot.

During the American Civil War, the First City Troop was called into active duty several times, beginning with the 1861 Campaign that led to the First Battle of Bull Run. During the Gettysburg Campaign, the company, under the command of future U.S. Speaker of the House Samuel J. Randall, performed scouting duties leading into the Battle of Gettysburg, Pennsylvania, in late June before being redeployed to York County following a brief skirmish on June 26, 1863. The company later screened Columbia-Wrightsville Bridge against the Confederate forces of John Brown Gordon.

John J. Pershing said that "no National Guard organization in the country did more, relatively, in the First World War than" the First City Troop.

Today, the First City Troop deploys overseas with the Pennsylvania National Guard in support of Army operations. Since 9/11, the unit has deployed to Bosnia, Iraq, Egypt, and Kuwait, with elements of the unit additionally deploying to Afghanistan, the Persian Gulf, Europe, and Latin America. Membership is by election. Soldiers on the active roll continue to donate their drill pay back to the unit, in order to maintain a tradition of voluntary service.

The troop draws its membership from Troop A, 1st Squadron, 104th Cavalry Regiment, 28th Infantry Division (United States), Pennsylvania Army National Guard.

Campaign credit

Revolutionary War
Battle of Trenton
Battle of Princeton
Battle of Brandywine
Battle of Germantown
New Jersey 1776
New Jersey 1777
Pennsylvania 1777

Civil War
Peninsula Campaign
First Battle of Bull Run
Battle of Antietam
Battle of Fredericksburg
Battle of Gettysburg
Battle of the Wilderness
Battle of Spotsylvania
Battle of Cold Harbor
Siege of Petersburg
Shenandoah
 Battle of Appomattox
Virginia 1861
Virginia 1862
Virginia 1863
Virginia 1864
Maryland 1863
Pennsylvania 1863

War with Spain
Puerto Rico

World War I
Battle of Ypres-Lys
Champagne-Marne
Aisne-Marne
Oise-Aisne
Meuse-Argonne
Champagne 1918
Lorraine 1918

World War II
Northern France
Central Europe

Operation Enduring Freedom
Global War on Terrorism Expeditionary Streamer

See also

City guard

References

Further reading
 Brooke, George, III. With the First City Troop on the Mexican Border. Philadelphia: 1917.
 Clark, William P. Official History of the Militia And the National Guard of the State of Pennsylvania from the Earliest Period of Record to the Present Time. 3 vols. Philadelphia: 1909–1912.
 First Troop Philadelphia City Cavalry. By-Laws, Muster Roll, and Papers Selected from the Archives of the First Troop Philadelphia City Cavalry, 1840.
 First Troop Philadelphia City Cavalry. History of the First Troop Philadelphia City Cavalry; From Its Organization November 17th 1774 to Its Centennial Anniversary .... Philadelphia: Hallowell, 1875.
 Hendler, Charles J., compiler. Official History of the Militia and National Guard of the State of Pennsylvania. 4 vols. Philadelphia: 1936.
 Hudson, Richard L. 1980. "At Ease, Troopers: Fall Out for Caviar and Pickled Herring- That's the Order Often Heard at Elite Philadelphia Club, A Unit of the National Guard." Wall Street Journal. February 29, 1980. Page A1, A26.
 
 Risley, Clyde A.; James P. Simpson; and John R. Elting. "Light-Horse of the City of Philadelphia, 1776-1777." Military Collector and Historian, 23 (Winter 1971), pp. 121–122.
 "A Return of the First City Troop, 1799." Pennsylvania Magazine of History and Biography, 23 (1899), p. 127.
 
 Meschter, G. Andrew. "The Gentlemen of Gloucester: A New Look at the First Troop Philadelphia City Cavalry" Agamemnon Publishing, 2015.

External links
 
 First City Troop in the Spanish–American War
 Initial roster
 Gentlemen of Gloucester

Pennsylvania National Guard
United States militia in the American Revolution
Military units and formations established in 1774
Pennsylvania in the American Civil War
Philadelphia in the American Revolution
Military units and formations in Pennsylvania
1774 establishments in Pennsylvania
Companies of the United States Army National Guard